Frances Tustin (born Frances Daisy Vickers; 1913 in Northern England) was a pioneering child psychotherapist renowned for her work with children with autism in the 1950s.  She became a teacher and began studying psychoanalysis in 1943 at the University of London.

Following the war, in 1950 she began the child psychotherapy training headed by the psychoanalyst Esther Bick in the children's department of  London's Tavistock Clinic, which was chaired by the pioneer in child development John Bowlby.

Psychotherapy career
In the mid-1950s she traveled to the US to  work at the James Jackson Putnam Center which treated autistic children through what today is seen as behavior therapy and began to extensively study, research and write about autism in what are some of the earliest writings on the condition.

She returned to London and published her first book Autism and Childhood Psychosis in 1972 followed by three more books and numerous journal articles, translated worldwide, up until her death, at age 81, in 1994.

Legacy
Her contribution to the development of psychoanalysis was recognized in 1984 by the British Psychoanalytical Society, which awarded her the rare status of Honorary Affiliate Member.

The Frances Tustin Memorial Trust awards an annual prize for papers addressing the treatment of autistic states in children, adolescents or adults.

Controversy
At the beginning of the 21st century with a gestalt shift in Autism studies underway, Tustin views on autism and the medical treatment have come under severe attack from self-advocating Autistic groups and some peer-reviewed articles.

References

External links
 The Frances Tustin Trust (featuring the history of Frances Tustin and her life's work)

Alumni of the University of London
1913 births
1990 deaths
Analysands of Wilfred Bion
Autism researchers
British psychotherapists
People educated at Kesteven and Grantham Girls' School
People from Grantham
Psychology writers